Onverwacht (Dutch and Afrikaans for 'unexpected') may refer to:

 Onverwacht, Suriname, a town in Suriname;
 Onverwacht, Limpopo, a town in the Limpopo province of South Africa;
 Onverwacht, Gauteng, a town in the Gauteng province of South Africa;
 Onverwacht series, a greenstone mountain formation from the Archean eon.